Herefordshire Archive and Records Centre holds the archives for the county of Herefordshire. The archives are held at Fir Tree Lane, Rotherwas, Hereford and run by Herefordshire Council.

References

Hereford
Archives in Herefordshire
History of Herefordshire
County record offices in England